Bruno Uvini Bortolança (born 3 June 1991) is a Brazilian footballer who plays as a centre back for Grêmio.

Club career

Early career
Uvini was born in Capivari, Brazil. He played in the Pinta de Craque football academy owned by his father, Bruno Uvini, known by Tuca, a former central defender at Ponte Preta, before moving to PAEC's youth system.

São Paulo
Uvini joined São Paulo FC's youth academy in 2007, aged 16. He was promoted to the club's senior side in 2010, and made his professional debut on 29 September 2010, coming on as a late substitute in a 2–4 loss at Grêmio, and also appeared in one further more game (again from the bench) in the season.

In 2011 Uvini appeared in six matches with Tricolor, being handed his first start on 26 June, in a 0–5 loss at Corinthians.

Tottenham (loan)
On 14 February 2012, Tottenham Hotspur agreed to sign signed Bruno Uvini on loan until the end of 2011–12 season, with an option to make the move permanent for €3.7 million.
Uvini failed to live up to expectations at Tottenham and the club opted not to sign him on a permanent basis. He left without making a first-team appearance for the London-based club.

Napoli
On 29 August 2012, it was reported that Uvini was having a medical with Serie A club Napoli, signing a five-year deal a day later. On 6 December he made his debut for the club, starting in a 1–3 home loss against PSV Eindhoven in that season's UEFA Europa League.

Uvini made his Serie A debut on 2 November 2013, replacing injured Giandomenico Mesto in 2–1 home success over Catania.

Siena (loan)
On 31 January 2013, Uvini was loaned to fellow top-divisioner Siena until 30 June. He did not appear in any official match for Siena, and returned to Napoli at the end of 2012–13 season.

Santos (loan)
On 30 March 2014 Uvini returned to Brazil, joining Santos on loan until the end of the year. He made his debut on 9 May, starting and playing 76 minutes in a 2–1 Copa do Brasil win at Princesa do Solimões.

On 18 July, Uvini scored his first professional goal, netting the first of a 2–0 home win against Palmeiras.

FC Twente (loan)

On 13 July 2015, Uvini signed a season long loan for Dutch side FC Twente .

Al Nassr

On 17 August 2016, Uvini agreed to go to Al Nassr FC of Saudi Professional League. He played three seasons and 77 games for the club.

Al-Wakrah

On July 2019, Uvini moved to Qatar and signed for Al-Wakrah SC, which promoted to Stars League.

Al-Ittihad

In the middle of 2019-2020 season, Univi returned to Saudi Arabia to join Al-Ittihad Club. He left the club just after the beginning of 2020-2021 season of Saudi Professional League.

FC Tokyo

On 29 January 2021, Univi agreed to join J1 League club FC Tokyo. In the 2021 season, he played 8 games for the club, and scored 1 goal at J.League Cup game against Tokushima Vortis. Though his contract with Tokyo continued in 2022 season, the club did not enroll him as a member of squad. On 29 August, Tokyo announced cancellation of the contract with Uvini.

International career
Uvini captained the Brazil U20 team in the 2011 South American Youth Championships. On 6 February 2011, Uvini suffered a fractured fibula in a match against Argentina which required surgery and kept him out of action for more than a month. Later in 2011, he captained the Brazilian side that won the U20 World Cup. In May 2012 he was called for main squad to friendly matches, and in July 2012 Uvini was called to play 2012 Olympic Games.

Personal life

Bruno Uvini is a practising Roman Catholic.

Career statistics

Club

International

Honours

Club

Youth
São Paulo
Copa São Paulo de Futebol Júnior: 2010

Senior
Al Nassr
Saudi Professional League: 2018–19

International
Brazil
South American Youth Championship: 2011
FIFA U-20 World Cup: 2011
2012 Summer Olympics: Men's football Silver medal

References

External links

 

1991 births
Living people
People from Capivari
Brazilian footballers
Brazilian Roman Catholics
Brazilian expatriate footballers
São Paulo FC players
Tottenham Hotspur F.C. players
S.S.C. Napoli players
A.C.N. Siena 1904 players
FC Twente players
Santos FC players
Al Nassr FC players
Al-Wakrah SC players
Ittihad FC players
FC Tokyo players
Expatriate footballers in Italy
Expatriate footballers in England
Expatriate footballers in the Netherlands
Expatriate footballers in Saudi Arabia
Expatriate footballers in Qatar
Expatriate footballers in Japan
Brazilian expatriate sportspeople in Italy
Brazilian expatriate sportspeople in England
Brazilian expatriate sportspeople in the Netherlands
Brazilian expatriate sportspeople in Saudi Arabia
Brazilian expatriate sportspeople in Qatar
Brazilian expatriate sportspeople in Japan
Brazil international footballers
Campeonato Brasileiro Série A players
Serie A players
Eredivisie players
Saudi Professional League players
Qatar Stars League players
J1 League players
Footballers at the 2012 Summer Olympics
Olympic footballers of Brazil
Olympic silver medalists for Brazil
Olympic medalists in football
Brazil under-20 international footballers
Brazil youth international footballers
Medalists at the 2012 Summer Olympics
Association football central defenders
Footballers from São Paulo (state)